The women's 4 × 5 km relay cross-country skiing competition at the 1992 Winter Olympics in Albertville, France, took place on 18 February at Les Saisies. The race saw the Unified Team beat Norway by 21.6 seconds, with Italy finishing third.

Results
Sources:

References

External links
Results International Ski Federation (FIS)

Women's cross-country skiing at the 1992 Winter Olympics
Women's 4 × 5 kilometre relay cross-country skiing at the Winter Olympics